Reska Węgorza is a river of Poland. It is a tributary of Rega river near Łobez.

Rivers of Poland
Rivers of West Pomeranian Voivodeship